Dentarene loculosa is a species of small sea snail, a marine gastropod mollusk, in the family Liotiidae.

Description
The size of the shell varies between 8 mm and 14 mm.

Distribution
This marine species occurs off Japan and the Philippines.

References

 Higo, S., Callomon, P. & Goto, Y. (1999). Catalogue and bibliography of the marine shell-bearing Mollusca of Japan. Osaka. : Elle Scientific Publications. 749 pp

External links
 To World Register of Marine Species
 

loculosa
Gastropods described in 1859